Marian FitzGerald Gaston (born 1971) is an American lawyer who serves as a judge of the San Diego County Superior Court in California. She is a nominee to serve as a United States district judge of the United States District Court for the Southern District of California.

Education 

Gaston received a  Bachelor of Arts from Emory University in 1993 and a Juris Doctor from UC Berkeley School of Law in 1996.

Career 

From 1996 to 2015, Gaston served as a deputy public defender in the San Diego County Public Defender's office. On March 27, 2015, Governor Jerry Brown appointed her as a judge of the San Diego County Superior Court. Gaston works in the collaborative courts program which includes specialized courts such as drug court, veterans treatment court, and behavioral health court that provide treatment and supervision for qualified individuals instead of incarceration. Since 2006, she has been a faculty member with the National Institute for Trial Advocacy. From 2004 to 2009, she was an adjunct professor at California Western School of Law where she taught trial skills classes and coached trial teams. In the spring 2010 term she taught Advanced Trial Advocacy at the McGeorge School of Law of the University of the Pacific. In the fall 2011 term she taught a course on sexual deviance and crime at the Thomas Jefferson School of  Law. In the spring 2014 term she taught an undergraduate sociology class in Social Control and the Law at the University of California, San Diego.

Notable cases 

 In 2000, Gaston represented Jason Williams, who pled guilty to a hate crime, attempted arson and other charges stemming from the March 26, 2000 attack on Midell Harper, a neighbor. Gaston said her client was on a drunken binge and had not been motivated by Harper's race. Williams was sentenced to 56 months in prison.

 In 2009, Gaston represented Matthew Hedge, who was alleged with violating his release as a sexually violent prisoner.

 In 2011, Gaston represented Philong Huynh, who was charged with murdering an Orange County resident in the Gaslamp Quarter, targeting young heterosexual men, whom he would drug and sexually assault.  Huynh was found guilty and sentenced to life without parole.

Nomination to district court 

On December 21, 2022, President Joe Biden announced his intent to nominate Gaston to serve as a United States district judge of the United States District Court for the Southern District of California. On January 23, 2023, her nomination was sent to the Senate. President Biden nominated Gaston to the seat vacated by Judge William Q. Hayes, who assumed senior status on August 1, 2021. Her nomination is pending before the Senate Judiciary Committee. On February 15, 2023, a hearing on her nomination was held before the Senate Judiciary Committee.

References 

1971 births
Living people
20th-century American women lawyers
20th-century American lawyers
21st-century American women judges
21st-century American judges
21st-century American women lawyers
21st-century American lawyers
California state court judges
Emory University alumni
People from Mobile, Alabama
Public defenders
Superior court judges in the United States
Thomas Jefferson School of Law people
UC Berkeley School of Law alumni
University of California, San Diego faculty
University of the Pacific (United States) faculty